Waresley and Gransden Woods is a  nature reserve between Waresley and Great Gransden in Cambridgeshire, England. It is managed by the Wildlife Trust for Bedfordshire, Cambridgeshire and Northamptonshire. The site is a  biological Site of Special Scientific Interest called Waresley Wood, with slightly different boundaries (but including Gransden Wood).

This ancient woodland is mainly ash, field maple and hazel. There are also rides with diverse flora such as the herbs bush vetch, meadowsweet, greater burnet-saxifrage and self-heal.

There is access by a path from Waresley Road.

References

Wildlife Trust for Bedfordshire, Cambridgeshire and Northamptonshire reserves
Sites of Special Scientific Interest in Cambridgeshire